The 2022 season was Penangs 96th competitive season, 2nd season in the first tier of Malaysian football since promoted in 2020, 101th year in existence as a football club, and the 2nd year since rebranded as Penang Football Club. The season covers the period from 1 December 2020 to 30 November 2021.

Players

Statistics

Appearances and goals

|-
|colspan="16"|Goalkeepers:
|-

|-
|colspan="16"|Defenders:
|-

|-
|colspan="16"|Midfielders:
|-

|-
|colspan="16"|Forwards:
|-

|-
! colspan=16 style=background:#dcdcdc; text-align:center| Players who left during the season but made an appearance

|-

References

Penang